Roag, meaning noisy place or 'deer bay' in Norse, is a small remote scattered hamlet on the north west shore of Pool Roag in the west of the Duirinish peninsula. Located on the Isle of Skye,  Scottish Highlands, it is in the Scottish council area of Highland.

Harlosh lies on the other side of Loch Vatten.

Roag also overlooks the sea lochs Loch Na Faolinn and Loch Bracadale.

There are about 27 houses in Roag.

Populated places in the Isle of Skye